Dillon Falls are rapids on the Deschutes River in the U.S. state of Oregon near Bend in the Deschutes National Forest.  With a pitch of 76.5°, the falls are a significant obstacle to whitewater running and are rated Class 5.

Unlike nearby Benham Falls, Dillon Falls are not widely documented because they are hard to see. Trails provide a somewhat better view of the falls. The falls were named after Leander Dillon, a nearby homesteader. He died in 1907.

Dillon Falls starts off as a dramatic  drop, then become a steep and violent class-5 rapids with a hazardously positioned tree in the center before ending as class 2 and 3.  Experienced rafters can run the falls before taking out at Lava Island Falls downstream.

The Falls have an additional danger— the area of the Deschutes River above is very calm, wide and open. The Falls are around a bend in the River and to the unknowledgeable, when one sees the warning signs in such a calm stream, there might be the temptation to ignore them. The slot of lava flows the falls cut through tend to limit the amount of sound that travels that direction, too, so the falls are not easily heard from the area of calm water.

See also 
 List of waterfalls in Oregon

References

 http://www.waterfallswest.com/waterfall.php?id=115

Waterfalls of Oregon
Waterfalls of Deschutes County, Oregon